Anastasija Marsenić (born 24 February 2003) is a Montenegrin handball player for Molde Elite and the Montenegrin national team.

She was selected as part of the Montenegrin 35-player squad for the 2020 European Women's Handball Championship.

Achievements
Norwegian Cup:
Finalist: 2021

References

2003 births
Living people
Montenegrin female handball players
People from Copenhagen
Expatriate handball players
Montenegrin expatriate sportspeople in Denmark
Montenegrin expatriate sportspeople in Norway